Neander may refer to:
Surname
 August Neander (1789–1850), a German theologian and church historian
 Ernst Neumann-Neander (1871–1954), founder of the now defunct Neander motorcycle manufacturer
 Joachim Neander (1650–1680), Calvinist teacher
 Michael Neander (1529–1581), professor of medicine at the University of Jena
 Michael Neander (philologist) (1525–1595), philologist from Sorau, Germany

Other uses
 Neander crater on the Moon.
 Neander Lake, a lake in Minnesota
Neander, character from Essay of Dramatick Poesie

See also
 Neandertal (valley) (formerly Neanderthal) in Germany
 Neanderthal

References

 

Surnames of German origin

de:Neander
fr:Neander
it:Neander
nl:Neander
ru:Neander
pt:Neander